Robert Gouldie (13 April 1905 – 17 December 1968) was a South African cricketer. He played in six first-class matches from 1927/28 to 1939/40.

References

External links
 

1905 births
1968 deaths
South African cricketers
Eastern Province cricketers
Free State cricketers
Cricketers from Kimberley, Northern Cape